The 1908–09 Cornell Big Red men's ice hockey season was the 8th season of play for the program.

Season
With an eye on joining the Intercollegiate Hockey Association, Cornell increased its slate of game once more, beginning the season with a three-game series against Pennsylvania, who were returning after an eight-year absence. The Big Red performed well, winning two and tying once, but they were unable to schedule any further games until the four weeks later when they went on another road trip. Their second sojourn went poorly as they were beaten in each of the three games and did not play particularly well in any.

In an effort to show their worth to the IHA committee, Cornell made a further road swing, with games scheduled against Dartmouth and Harvard. Despite several of the players being hurt or injured the Big Red played well against Dartmouth, losing 0–1, but the game against Harvard had to be called off due to poor ice conditions.

The team did not have a head coach but Jefferson Vincent served as team manager.

Roster

Standings

Schedule and Results

|-
!colspan=12 style=";" | Regular Season

References

Cornell Big Red men's ice hockey seasons
Cornell
Cornell
Cornell
Cornell